Pic de Bure is a prominent mountain of the Dauphiné Alps in France, culminating at a height of , the third highest peak of the Dévoluy Mountains. The Plateau de Bure Interferometer is located on its slopes.

Notes

Mountains of the Alps
Mountains of Hautes-Alpes
Dauphiné Prealps